Putauaki (also known in English as Mount Edgecumbe) is a dacite volcanic cone in the Bay of Plenty Region of New Zealand. Located 50 km east of Rotorua and three kilometres east of Kawerau, it is the easternmost vent of the Okataina volcanic centre, within the Taupo Volcanic Zone. The mountain rises to 820 m above sea level, and is visible from the waters of the Bay of Plenty, 30 km to the north. Every year a King of the Mountain race is run on Putauaki as part of the international King of the Mountain series, and proceeds are donated to charity.

History
The last substantial volcanic eruption occurred around 300 BCE, producing a cubic kilometre of lava.

Captain James Cook named the mountain "Mount Edgecumbe" on 2 November 1769, possibly in honour of John Edgecombe, the sergeant of marines on his vessel, the Endeavour.
The mountain's official name changed back to Putauaki in 1925.

The New Zealand government took part of the mountain from the Ngāti Awa people in the 1880s as part of a series of North Island land confiscations, supposedly for the purposes of military settlement. In a 1999 report the Waitangi Tribunal declared the confiscation illegal because there was no prospect of placing settlers on the mountain.

Legendary source of name 
Māori legend tells of a love affair that Pūtauaki had with Whakaari/White Island. 
Another version of the legend is that Pūtauaki was lonely after losing a fight for Pīhanga (another mountain) so when he met Tarawera he decided to start a relationship with her. After raising a son and years of a troubled marriage, Pūtauaki cast his eye out towards the sea, where the very beautiful Whakaari was. The two would call out to each other at night while Tarawera slept. One night Pūtauaki could not contain his love any longer and decided to travel out to be with Whakaari. It is said that a mountain can only move once in their life and only at night so Pūtauaki had to travel across the land fast. Little did he know, his son had awoken and was following him. He heard the little whimper from his son and turned around. He tried to tell his son to stay with Tarawera but the little mountain would not leave his father. Then the sun rose and froze the two mountains where they were. When Tarawera awoke she saw that her husband had left and she started to weep, thus creating the Tarawera Falls and river. Until this day Tarawera still cries and Whakaari still calls out for her lover, who is frozen to the spot near Kawerau.

Transmitter 
Putauaki is home to a major FM radio transmitter for the eastern Bay of Plenty. Prior to digital television transition in December 2013, the transmitter was also the main analogue television transmitter for the area.

Gallery

See also

List of volcanoes in New Zealand

References

External links
 Walking up Mount Edgecumbe - at peakbagging.co.nz

Whakatane District
Volcanoes of the Bay of Plenty Region
Okataina Volcanic Centre
Volcanic cones
VEI-5 volcanoes
Whakatane Graben
Taupō Volcanic Zone